Rudy Ravy de Pina Monteiro (born 22 May 1996) is a Cape Verdean footballer who plays in Portugal for União da Madeira as a forward.

Football career
On 28 December 2018, Monteiro made his professional debut with Marítimo in a 2018–19 Taça da Liga match against Estoril Praia.

References

External links

1996 births
People from Fogo, Cape Verde
Living people
Cape Verdean footballers
Association football forwards
C.S. Marítimo players
C.F. União players
Campeonato de Portugal (league) players
Cape Verdean expatriate footballers
Expatriate footballers in Portugal